Camp Point Township is one of twenty-two townships in Adams County, Illinois, United States.  As of the 2020 census, its population was 1,654 and it contained 679 housing units.

History
Camp Point was organized as a political township in 1849. The township took its name from a former Indian camping site within its borders.

Geography

Cities, villages and towns
 Camp Point

Cemeteries
The township contains three cemeteries: Evergreen, Hebron and Wallace.

Major highways
  US Route 24
  Illinois State Route 94

Airports and landing strips
 Searls Field
 Searls RLA 59 Airport

Landmarks
 Bailey Park

Demographics
As of the 2020 census there were 1,654 people, 588 households, and 379 families residing in the township. The racial makeup of the township was 94.86% White, 0.24% African American, 0.12% Native American, 0.48% Asian, 0.00% Pacific Islander, 0.48% from other races, and 3.81% from two or more races. Hispanic or Latino of any race were 1.21% of the population.

There were 588 households, out of which 37.40% had children under the age of 18 living with them, 49.32% were married couples living together, 6.46% had a female householder with no spouse present, and 35.54% were non-families. 28.10% of all households were made up of individuals, and 13.10% had someone living alone who was 65 years of age or older. The average household size was 2.63 and the average family size was 3.29.

The township's age distribution consisted of 30.6% under the age of 18, 6.3% from 18 to 24, 21.3% from 25 to 44, 24.9% from 45 to 64, and 17.0% who were 65 years of age or older. The median age was 37.5 years. For every 100 females, there were 104.4 males. For every 100 females age 18 and over, there were 94.8 males.

The median income for a household in the township was $56,121, and the median income for a family was $70,139. Males had a median income of $41,842 versus $30,486 for females. The per capita income for the township was $24,096. About 2.6% of families and 5.7% of the population were below the poverty line, including 7.2% of those under age 18 and 9.6% of those age 65 or over.

School districts
 Camp Point Community Unit School District 3

Political districts
 Illinois' 18th congressional district
 State House District 93
 State Senate District 47

References

External links
 List of Adams County township trustees
 City-Data.com
 Illinois State Archives

Townships in Adams County, Illinois
Townships in Illinois
1849 establishments in Illinois